St. John's Preparatory School is an independent, preparatory day school for boys aged 5 to 12 in Borrowdale, Harare, Zimbabwe. The school is owned and governed by the St. John's Educational Trust, as is St. John's College.

St. John's Preparatory School is a member of the Association of Trust Schools (ATS) and the Headmaster is a member of the Conference of Heads of Independent Schools in Zimbabwe (CHISZ).

History
St John’s Preparatory School was founded in 1956 by Peter and Barbara Hickman at their Borrowdale property. It began as a small family school with 13 pupils. It was their desire to establish a school for boys which offered "a sound system of education in an atmosphere conducive to the growth and development of each personality". The school grew to 120 boys with a class in each grade from 1 to 7. Pressure on places was such, that in the early eighties the school doubled in numbers, and then trebled with three classes in each year group and a total of 525 boys.

Activities
Each pupil is expected to participate in at least one sport and one cultural activity.

Sports
The following sports are offered: athletics, cricket, cross country, football, golf, hockey, rugby, squash, swimming, tennis, triathlon, volleyball and water polo.

Clubs
Each pupil is expected to participate in one cultural activity. The following clubs are available: Art, Chess, Computers, Choir, Debating, Drama, Environmental Club, Golf, Marimbas, Recorders, Squash and Triathlon.

List of School Heads

Notable alumni
 Eli Snyman - South Africa, Italy and England rugby union player
TJ Maguranyanga - Zimbabwe rugby union player

See also

 St. John's College (Harare)
 List of schools in Zimbabwe

References

External links
 St. John's Preparatory School Official website
 St. John's Preparatory School Profile on the ATS website

P
Schools in Harare
Private schools in Zimbabwe
Boys' schools in Zimbabwe
Day schools in Zimbabwe
Educational institutions established in 1956
1956 establishments in the Federation of Rhodesia and Nyasaland
Member schools of the Association of Trust Schools